Alga is a village in Batken Region of Kyrgyzstan. It is part of the Kadamjay District. Its population was 4,362 in 2021.

References

Populated places in Batken Region